Nohant-Vic is a commune in the Indre department in central France.

Geography
The commune lies on the lower Jurassic rocks at the southern margin of the Paris Basin. Just to the south of La Châtre, some twelve kilometres south of Vic, the Variscan-faulted rocks of the Massif Central begin with Cambrian/Ordovician migmatite.

It is near the southern end of the old province of Berry.

Population

Sights
The House of George Sand is a country house dating from late eighteenth century, built for the governor of Vierzon and acquired in 1793 by Madame Dupin de Francueil, grandmother of the writer. George Sand spent her childhood and adolescence there. Most of her writing was done at the house. She received some illustrious guests including Liszt and Marie d'Agoult, Balzac, Chopin and Flaubert. Delacroix also had a studio there. The estate is today a property of the nation and run by the Centre des monuments nationaux.

The ancient church in Nohant-Vic features a collection of early wall paintings.

Personalities
 Marie-Aurore de Saxe (1748–1821), daughter of the Maréchal de Saxe, who bought the Nohant estate in 1793.
 Aurore Dupin, known as George Sand (1804–1876), granddaughter of the above, who spent most of her life at Nohant.
 Frédéric Chopin (March 1, 1810 – October 17, 1849) composed some of his greatest works in George Sand's estate in Nohant.

See also
Saint-Benoît-du-Sault
Communes of the Indre department

References

Communes of Indre